Arthur Robert Hart (22 June 1917 – 16 October 1981) was an Australian rules footballer who played for the Fitzroy Football Club in the Victorian Football League (VFL).

Two of his brothers, Eddie Hart, and Don Hart also played for Fitzroy.

Notes

External links 

1917 births
1981 deaths
Australian rules footballers from Victoria (Australia)
Fitzroy Football Club players